Zangakatun is a village in the Ararat Municipality of the Ararat Province of Armenia. Zangakatun is the birthplace and burial site of Paruyr Sevak; his house is a museum. The village is also home to a 10th-century chapel.

References 

World Gazeteer: Armenia – World-Gazetteer.com

Populated places in Ararat Province